The Inamori Ethics Prize is an annual award presented by the Inamori International Center for Ethics and Excellence at Case Western Reserve University. The prize honors exemplary ethical international leaders "whose actions and influence have greatly improved the condition of humankind". The prize was first awarded in 2008 to Dr. Francis Collins, an American physician who is credited with discovering a number of genes associated with human diseases.

The Inamori Ethics prize is also awarded with a monetary award, which is to be used in the recipients' ongoing projects. Each year, the honoree of the prize delivers a public lecture about their ongoing work at Case Western Reserve University.

Recipients 
Source:

 2022: Paul Farmer
 2021: Not awarded
 2020: Silvia Fernández de Gurmendi
 2019: LeVar Burton
 2018: Farouk El-Baz
 2017: Marian Wright Edelman
 2016: Peter Eigen
 2015: Martha Nussbaum
 2014: Denis Mukwege
 2013: Yvon Chouinard
 2012: David Suzuki
 2011: Beatrice Mtetwa
 2010: Stan Brock
 2009: Mary Robinson
 2008: Francis Collins

References 

Case Western Reserve University
American awards
Awards established in 2008
Ethics